Pat Shea may refer to:

 Pat Shea (ice hockey) (1911–1978), ice hockey center for the Maine mariners hockey club in the echl.
 Pat Shea (American football) (1939–2013), American football player
 Red Shea (Patrick Henry Shea, 1898–1981), Major League Baseball pitcher